The Thoreau–Alcott House is a historic house at 255 Main Street in Concord, Massachusetts, United States that was home to the writers Henry David Thoreau and Louisa May Alcott at different times.

Description and history
The house was built in 1849 by Josiah Davis and was added to the National Register of Historic Places on July 12, 1976.

Henry David Thoreau moved to this home in 1850 with his family; he stayed until his death on May 6, 1862. After the death of her mother Abby May, Louisa May Alcott purchased the home for her recently widowed sister Anna Alcott Pratt. Louisa also moved to the house, along with her father Amos Bronson Alcott. It was in this home that Louisa wrote her novel Jo's Boys (1886), a sequel to Little Women (1868).

Today, the home remains privately owned.

See also
National Register of Historic Places listings in Concord, Massachusetts

References

External links

Thoreau–Alcott House Story, from Concord Free Public Library

Houses on the National Register of Historic Places in Concord, Massachusetts
Houses in Concord, Massachusetts
Henry David Thoreau
Houses completed in 1849
1849 establishments in Massachusetts